Kodwo is a given name. Notable people with the name include:

 Kodwo Addison (1927–1985), Ghanaian politician and trade unionist
 Kodwo Sam Annan, Ghanaian politician
 Kodwo Eshun (born 1967), British-Ghanaian writer, theorist, and filmmaker

African given names